Pavares Variyalongkorn (etc.; 14 September 1809 – 28 September 1892) was a Buddhist scholar, historian and a prince of the Chakri dynasty. A son of the Viceroy Maha Senanurak and Noi Lek, the prince became a monk in 1830 and was given the dharma name Paññāaggo. In 1851 he succeed Mongkut as the second abbot of Wat Bowonniwet Vihara, upon the latter's accession to the throne as king. In the same year he was elevated in princely rank and received a new name; Krom Muen Bowonrangsisuriphan. In 1873 he was once again elevated in princely rank and became Krom Phra Pavares Variyalongkorn. In 1891 he was appointed Supreme Patriarch by King Chulalongkorn. He remained in this position until his death in 1892.

He kept a daily record of rainfall and significant events for 45 years from 1855 to 1890. The compilation took up thirteen folding-book manuscripts. The chronicle is a significant historical record of weather and society during the reigns of King Mongkut and King Chulalongkorn.

References 

Supreme Patriarchs of Thailand
19th-century Thai historians
1809 births
1892 deaths
Thai Buddhist monks
19th-century Chakri dynasty
Thai male Phra Ong Chao
People from Bangkok
Thai male writers
19th century in Siam
19th-century non-fiction writers
19th-century poets
Male non-fiction writers